Sigh No More may refer to:

 "Sigh No More", a song by William Shakespeare appearing in Much Ado About Nothing
 Sigh No More (musical), a 1945 musical revue written and produced by Noël Coward
 Sigh No More (Gamma Ray album), 1991
 Sigh No More (Mumford & Sons album), 2009
 Sigh No More, a 1991 album by Dog Age